Błażej Koniusz (born 22 February 1988 in Świętochłowice) is a tennis player from Poland.

Koniusz has a career high ATP singles ranking of World No. 445, achieved on 7 July 2008. He also has a career high ATP doubles ranking of World No. 150, achieved on 16 February 2015.

Koniusz began playing at the age of four, and joined his first club at the age of seven. As a junior, he and compatriot Grzegorz Panfil won the 2006 Australian Open boys' doubles championship, defeating Americans Kellen Damico and Nathaniel Schnugg 7–6(7–5), 6–3 in the final. He began his senior career in 2006.

Koniusz represented Team Poland during Davis Cup play in 2008.

Junior Grand Slam finals

Doubles: 1 (1–0)

ATP Challenger and ITF Futures finals

Singles: 5 (1–4)

Doubles: 38 (18–20)

References

External links
 
 

Living people
1988 births
Polish male tennis players
People from Świętochłowice
Sportspeople from Silesian Voivodeship
Grand Slam (tennis) champions in boys' doubles
Australian Open (tennis) junior champions